Rafid Chadafi Lestaluhu (born 16 October 1993) is an Indonesian professional footballer who plays as a winger for Liga 3 club Persibat Batang.

Career 
In 2015, he signed with Persita Tangerang.

Personal life 
Lestaluhu is the twin brother of Abduh Lestaluhu, they have an older brother Ramdani Lestaluhu and a younger brother Pandi Lestaluhu who are also professional footballers.

References

External links 
 
 Rafid Lestaluhu at ligaindonesiabaru.com

1993 births
Living people
Indonesian footballers
Liga 1 (Indonesia) players
Pelita Bandung Raya players
Persita Tangerang players
People from Tulehu
Sportspeople from Maluku (province)
Association football midfielders
21st-century Indonesian people